Cryptolepine is an alkaloid with antimalarial and cytotoxic properties, in vitro and in mice. It is able to intercalate into DNA at the cytosine-cytosine sites. Because of its toxicity, Cryptolepine is not considered appropriate for use as an anti-malarial drug in humans.

Cryptolepine can be found in the roots of the West African plant, Cryptolepis sanguinolenta.

References

Antimalarial agents
Experimental cancer drugs
Quinoline alkaloids